Archaeology, Anthropology, and Interstellar Communication is a 2014 collection of essays edited by Douglas Vakoch and published by NASA. The book is focused on the role that the humanities and social sciences, in particular anthropology and archaeology, play in the search for extraterrestrial intelligence. The seventeen essays explore issues such as the evolutionary and cultural prerequisites of interstellar civilizations communicating with one another; the difficulties of understanding signs and symbols developed by vastly different societies, whether terrestrial or extraterrestrial; and issues faced by new societies making first contact with one another.

Despite originally being scheduled for publication in June 2014, a PDF of Archaeology, Anthropology, and Interstellar Communication was accidentally released a month prior to the intended date and reviewed by Gizmodo. The significant positive response to the book inspired NASA to bring forward the e-book release, making it freely available on their website from May of that year.

Upon its release, Archaeology, Anthropology, and Interstellar Communication received widespread media coverage. In addition to generally positive reviews, the book was at the center of controversy regarding misinterpretation of one of its essays. A quote about ancient terrestrial stone carvings, stating that they "might have been made by aliens" for all that they were understood by modern anthropologists, was picked up by publications such as TheBlaze, The Huffington Post, and Artnet and misreported in headlines.

Synopsis
Historically, research into extraterrestrial intelligence has fallen within natural science and focused primarily on the technological obstacles to alien communication, such as processing the data encoded in signals received from potential extraterrestrial civilizations. Archaeology, Anthropology, and Interstellar Communication was written as part of an expansion of the field to humanities and social sciences, focusing on the role archaeologists and anthropologists play in extraterrestrial intelligence research. The difficulties of studying ancient societies on Earth, editor Douglas Vakoch argues, are applicable to those of studying potential societies outside Earth.

Archaeology, Anthropology, and Interstellar Communication is a collection of essays exploring the roles archaeology and anthropology play in extraterrestrial research, focusing on both historical and modern perspectives. Issues discussed in the essays include the evolutionary and cultural prerequisites for interstellar communication, the challenges for semiotics in decoding alien signs and symbols, and the complexities of cross-cultural communication with aliens by analogy to anthropological first contact experiences.

Essays

"Historical Perspectives on SETI"
The essays in this section summarize the history of SETI at NASA, the circumstances that led to the government cutting public funding for SETI, and the role the social sciences have historically played in the search.

"SETI: The NASA Years" is a synopsis of NASA's involvement with SETI by John Billingham, who was involved with the project from its genesis in 1969 to its closure in 1995. He discusses the 1960s origins of the search for alien life in the universe, the project's struggle to receive popular respect and government funding, and its ultimate cessation at the agency due to funding cuts, after which it was absorbed by the privately funded SETI Institute.

"A Political History of NASA's SETI Program", by Stephen J. Garber, analyzes the circumstances that led to the end of public funding for the program; NASA's SETI program was small and provided few jobs that would make cutting it politically complex, while widespread skepticism about the existence of intelligent alien life also made the project inherently controversial. NASA's funding also suffered through the 1990s due to publicized issues with the Hubble Space Telescope, weakening its political position to defend a marginal program such as SETI.

"The Role of Anthropology in SETI: A Historical View" by Steven J. Dick discusses the history of SETI, anthropology, and their intersection. Representation of the social sciences in SETI research began during the field's early days in the 1960s and 1970s, but was, according to the essay, often tokenistic; Dick traces significant interdisciplinary work as beginning in the 1980s, with particular focus on the publication of Interstellar Migration and the Human Experience in 1986.

"Archaeological Analogues"
The essays in this section focus on the relevance of archaeological comparisons for discussing the anticipated difficulties with communication between humans and aliens. "A Tale of Two Analogues" by Ben Finney and Jerry Bentley draws on Finney's studies of Mayan culture; they draw comparisons between the protracted process of translating Mayan works and the difficulty of translating an alien work, and cast doubt on the views of some mathematicians and natural scientists that an extraterrestrial civilization would communicate with humanity solely through the "universal language" of mathematics and science.

"Beyond Linear B" by Richard Saint-Gelais analyses potential alien communication through a semiotic lens, commenting on the issues with interpreting the signs and symbols of a fundamentally different culture. He notes that the issues faced in semiotic challenges such as decoding an unknown human language may be even greater for an alien language; for instance, he describes how all known human languages have used either alphabetic, syllabic, or ideographic writing systems, and anthropologists are able to estimate which an unknown language uses by its number of characters, which may not be a shared assumption for an extraterrestrial writing system.

"Learning to Read" focuses on the hypothetical alien translation of interstellar messages transmitted by humanity. Its author Kathryn E. Denning deems the task of writing alien-translatable messages "neither trivial nor impossible", considering a difficult task but one worthy of study; she discusses the need for interdisciplinary study to produce such messages, with important work from fields such as cryptography and anthropology. She also discusses the polarized views of natural and social sciences on the issue of alien translation, with natural scientists tending to take far more optimistic perspectives of the ease of translation than social scientists.

"Inferring Intelligence" by Paul K. Wason describes the difficulty of understanding the work of prehistoric cultures and compares this difficulty to that of understanding the work of extraterrestrial cultures. He refers to the controversy regarding the meaning of Paleolithic cave art, as well as the relative recency of identifying stone tools as the intentional productions of intelligent beings.

"Anthropology, Culture, and Communication"
John W. Traphagan has two essays in this section. In "Anthropology at a Distance", he draws comparison between the "anthropology at a distance" practice of anthropologists in the early nineteenth century, who often lacked the resources to perform fieldwork with the societies they studied, and the practice of SETI in discussing and studying uncontacted extraterrestrials. "Culture and Communication with Extraterrestrial Intelligence", Traphagan's second essay in the collection, focuses on the concept of hypothetical "universal languages" such as music or mathematics and the differences human and alien cultures may have in their interpretation of these languages.

"Contact Considerations" by Douglas Raybeck considers human-alien interaction through comparison to terrestrial colonial interactions. He gives the specific examples of European contact with Aztec, Japanese, Chinese, Iroquois, and Maori culture, all five cultures being politically and technologically complex at the time of first European contact. He discusses the likely significance of trade to human-alien interactions, both for goods and services exchanged in trade between human cultures, but potentially also for things such as music that may not exist in an alien culture.

In "Speaking for Earth", Albert A. Harrison discusses the development, longevity, and potential consequences of projecting interstellar messages. He takes an optimistic position of the benevolence of extraterrestrial civilizations, referring to his own anthropological research that shows societies that endure for long periods tend to be more peaceful and less aggressive. Harrison supports Active SETI, the process of actively transmitting messages from Earth to potential interstellar societies, and discusses planned and actual attempts at it.

"The Evolution and Embodiment of Extraterrestrials"
Vakoch's chapter, "The Evolution of Extraterrestrials", focuses on hypotheses of what an alien intelligence would look like, such as whether it would be humanoid or nonhumanoid. He discusses how as early as The Celestial Worlds Discover'd, published in 1698 and one of the first works to consider the lives of extraterrestrial beings, the possibility was raised that aliens would have similar body plans to humans (such as walking upright) but look radically different within such confines. Both arguments in favour of convergent evolution to a functionally humanoid form and divergent evolution to a radically inhuman form are summarized and considered.

"Biocultural Prerequisites for the Development of Interstellar Communication" by Garry Chick discusses the Drake equation, a means through which to estimate the number of extraterrestrial civilizations in the Milky Way galaxy capable of communicating with humans. Referring to statements by figures such as Michael Crichton that the parameters in the Drake equation are unknowable, and that this casts foundational doubt on the validity of SETI, Chick aims to narrow the range of possible estimates for these parameters.

In "Ethology, Ethnology, and Communication with Extraterrestrial Intelligence", Lestel considers the philosophical definition of 'communication' in the context of human-alien contact. He holds that contact between terrestrial and extraterrestrial societies would have traits of both ethnology, the study of other human cultures, and ethology, the study of animal behaviour.

In the book's final essay, "Constraints on Message Construction for Communication with Extraterrestrial Intelligence", William H. Edmondson summarizes the issue of designing messages to be understood by extraterrestrial societies. He notes the assumptions involved in constructing interstellar messages, such as that aliens will have senses and that aspects of cognitive function (e.g. intentional behaviour) will be shared between all intelligent organisms.

Publication history
Vakoch, a self-described exo-semiotician whose research interests include psychology, comparative religion, and the philosophy of science, has been interested in interstellar communication for many years. In a 2002 interview with Dennis Overbye for the New York Times, he discussed his criticism of the natural sciences focus of SETI research and his work to approach the subject from a humanities-focused lens, including the comparison of interstellar communication to cross-cultural and cross-chronological interactions between terrestrial societies. One of Vakoch's goals in compiling and editing Archaeology, Anthropology, and Interstellar Communication was to highlight less optimistic perspectives on interstellar communications from such fields, addressing the concerns raised by significant inferential gaps that the natural sciences had failed to address.

NASA intended to publish Archaeology, Anthropology, and Interstellar Communication in both print and e-book form on 10 June 2014. On 21 May, a PDF was accidentally published on NASA's website and picked up by Gizmodo. The PDF was taken down rapidly after Gizmodo published a review, with the expectation of re-releasing it on the originally intended date; however, the demand for copies was so high that the publication was accelerated, with MOBI, EPUB, and PDF versions officially released several days later. A paperback edition was published September 2014 and a hardcover edition was published that December. The electronic version is available for free download through NASA's website.

Cultural impact and reception

Archaeology, Anthropology, and Interstellar Communication was picked up by Gizmodo shortly prior to its intended publication and positively reviewed, described as "truly fascinating stuff" that managed to be both complex and accessible. The Gizmodo review began with an out-of-context quote from William Edmondson's essay on how mysterious stone carvings "might have been made by aliens" as a metaphor for the difficulties in researching long-lost ancient societies; though the review went on to note that this should not be interpreted as a literal statement, the quote was picked up by publications such as Artnet, TheBlaze, and The Huffington Post as a clickbait headline. Some of these articles noted that the statement was not representative of the essay's content, while others took it at face value. Jeff Foust decried the phenomenon in his review, but said it "unwittingly demonstrates the challenges of interstellar communications" by highlighting how difficult even communication between human beings of similar cultures can be.

Upon the book's official release, it received mostly positive reviews. Emily Gertz, writing for Popular Science, found it "refreshing" and compared the issues it raised to those explored by science fiction works such as The Sparrow. Michael Franco of CNET lauded its comprehensiveness, while Jolene Creighton of From Quarks to Quasars called it "a fantastic text to save for a rainy day". Writing for the Daily Dot, Aja Romano commented that the book came from a thoroughly optimistic point of view about both the existence and benevolence of extraterrestrial intelligence, but that it provided thorough investigation into SETI and had a strong backing in the fields it investigated. Mark Anderson, Chair of the Notable Documents Panel of the American Library Association's Government Documents Round Table and research librarian at the University of Northern Colorado, reviewed Archaeology, Anthropology, and Interstellar Communication for Library Journal alongside other books published by United States government offices. He highlighted the depth of the book's scholarship and its ability to combine it with accessible writing.

In June 2014, weeks after the book's official release, Joshua Rothman interviewed Vakoch for The New Yorker about the struggles of extraterrestrial communication. Vakoch explained the book's purpose further, discussing the integral role archaeologists and anthropologists play in extraterrestrial research. He referred to the conclusions made by essayists, such as Lestel's discussion of the implications involved in being unable to understand or decode potential alien messages. Vakoch described the humanities perspective on extraterrestrial communication as increasingly "skeptical and critical", but "a criticism that engages, as opposed to a criticism that dismisses"; he noted that although bridging the communication gap with an extraterrestrial civilization would be a difficult ask, the rapid discovery of exoplanets in the past decades increased the likelihood extraterrestrial intelligence would be identified.

References

External links
 PDF available for free download through NASA

2014 non-fiction books
Essay anthologies
Search for extraterrestrial intelligence
Anthropology books
Books about extraterrestrial life
Archaeology books
Interstellar communication